Two ships of the United States Navy have borne the name USS Fiske, in honor of Rear Admiral Bradley A. Fiske.

She was transferred to Turkey in 1981 and served as TCG Piyalepasa (D350) until she was scrapped in 1999

United States Navy ship names